The Daily Freeman is a seven-day-a-week morning newspaper in Kingston, New York, the Ulster County seat. Serving all of Ulster County and adjacent parts of three other counties in the mid-Hudson Valley—Greene, Columbia and Dutchess counties.

The broadsheet publication was founded in 1871 as the Rondout Daily Freeman and was located in Downtown Kingston on the Rondout–West Strand Historic District.  It relocated to its current Hurley Avenue headquarters in Uptown Kingston in November 1974.

The Freeman is a unionized newspaper. Employees are represented by the Kingston Newspaper Guild. The paper is owned by 21st-Century Media, which is part of MediaNews Group, formerly Digital First Media.

References

External links
 
 Journal Register Company
 HRVH Historical Newspapers

Daily newspapers published in New York (state)
21st Century Media publications
Mass media in Ulster County, New York
Kingston, New York